Scotia Speedworld is a Canadian motorsport race track in the Halifax Regional Municipality.

Situated in  Enfield on Highway 102 immediately west of Halifax International Airport, the facility was built in 1987 and seats 6,000 spectators. The track celebrated its 25th year of racing in 2012.

The track is a 3/10-mile D-oval, asphalt with concrete in lower groove on corners. Weekly racing includes Sportsman, Trucks, Legends, Thunder Cars, Lightning Cars and Bandoleros classes. Special events include the Maple Leaf Monster Jam Tour (monster trucks) and the Parts for Trucks Maritime Pro Stock Tour. The track operates from May to September.

References

External links
Scotia Speedworld Website

Motorsport venues in Nova Scotia
Paved oval racing venues in Canada
Sports venues in Halifax, Nova Scotia
Sports venues completed in 1987
1987 establishments in Nova Scotia